Jean-Baptiste Gabriel Marie de Milcent (28 June 1747, Paris  1833, Paris) was a French playwright and journalist.

Raised by the Jesuits, he directed the Journal d'agriculture for twenty years. On 5 January 1785, he established the Journal ou Annales de Normandie, biweekly until 30 December 1789, which he renamed the Journal de Normandie, ou de Rouen 18 June 1790 and which appeared three times a week until October 31, 1790, then daily from November 1790 to 11 May 1791. Returning to Paris at the outbreak of the Revolution, he became secretary of the Académie royale de musique in 1795.

Familiar with Diderot, d’Alembert and Marie-Thérèse Geoffrin, he composed lyrical tragedies, some of which, such as Les Deux Statues, had a great success..

He was a member of the Académie des sciences, belles-lettres et arts de Rouen.

Literature 
1775: Le Dix-huitième Siècle vengé, épître à M.D.***, La Haye, [s.n.]
1776: Azor & Zimeo, conte moral ; followed by Thiamis, conte indien, Paris, Merigot jeune
1778: La Prise de Jéricho, oratorio, Paris : P. Delormel
1785: Les Deux Frères, two-act comedy, Paris: Cailleau
1786: Agnes Bernau, pièce héroïque in four acts and in free verse, Rouen, Boucher
1793: Les Deux Statues, one-act comedy, Rouen, Vve L. Dumesnil et Montier
1800: Praxitelle ou La ceinture, one-act opera, Paris, Ballard
1801: Hécube, three-act tragédie lyrique, Paris, Ballard
1807: Les Deux Statues, opéra comique in one act and in prose, Paris
1813: Médée et Jason, three-act tragédie-lyrique, Paris, Ballard
1825: Lord Davenant, drama in four acts and in prose, Paris, J.-N. Barba

Publications on agronomy 
 La Chaumière des champs, ou nouveau Traité d’agriculture pratique générale, dédié aux cultivateurs et aux amis des arts ; ouvrage utile aux administrations, aux propriétaires et à toutes les personnes qui s’intéressent à l’amélioration et aux progrès de l’art de l’agriculture, Paris, Impr. de Delaguette, 1820, in-12, 48 p.
 Nouveaux éléments d’agronomie et de physique végétal..., Paris, Mme Huzard, 1822, in-12, 96 p.

Journalism 
 Journal de Normandie, 1785-30 December 1789, Rouen, Vve Laurent Dumesnil
 Journal ou Annales de Normandie, no. 1-72, year 1790, Rouen, Vve Laurent Dumesnil
 Journal de Normandie, ou de Rouen, et du Département de la Seine inférieure, 18 June 1790 – 11 May 1791, Rouen, Vve Laurent Dumesnil
 Journal de Rouen, et du Département de la Seine inférieure, 12 May 1791 – 27 October 1795, Rouen, Vve Laurent Dumesnil

External links 
 His plays and their présentations on CÉSAR
 Jean-Baptiste de Milcent on data.bnf.fr

18th-century French dramatists and playwrights
19th-century French dramatists and playwrights
18th-century French journalists
19th-century French journalists
French male journalists
Writers from Paris
1747 births
1833 deaths
19th-century French male writers
18th-century French male writers